"Wrong Way" is a song by American band Sublime, released on May 25, 1997 as the third single from their third album Sublime. The song fits squarely within the punk rock-inspired third wave ska movement of the 1990s. The song reached number 47 on the Billboard Hot 100 Airplay chart and it spent 26 weeks and peaked at number three on Billboards Alternative Songs chart.

Composition
The trombone solo, played by Jon Blondell, contains an interpolation of the theme from George Gershwin's "Rhapsody in Blue".

The version of the song played on the radio typically edits a use of the word "tits" but does not remove it entirely, instead simply lowering the "I" sound so that what is being said is slightly less obvious.

Lyrical interpretation
The lyrics of the song refers to the life of a 12-year-old girl named Annie, who was soon to be forced into prostitution by her family of "seven horny brothers and her drunk-ass dad." She is “rescued” and sexually and ethically violated by the narrator of the song. An ironic twist is added in the lyrical references hinting that the narrator saved her and then regretted mistreating her himself.

Music video
A music video was directed by Gregory Dark, starring Bijou Phillips, soon after the band's lead singer, Bradley Nowell, had died. The video has a cameo by Mike Watt of the bands Minutemen, Firehose, and Dos; he was one of the biggest influences on bass guitar player Eric Wilson. The pornography producer Maestro Claudio plays the clown/dad. The video also includes a brief cameo by Fishbone lead singer, Angelo Moore, as well as members of Skunk Records band the Ziggens.

Charts

References

External links

1996 songs
1997 singles
Sublime (band) songs
MCA Records singles
Song recordings produced by David Kahne
Songs written by Bradley Nowell
Songs about prostitutes
Songs about teenagers